Ketlin Saar (born 2 May 1997) is an Estonian footballer who plays as a defender for JK Tallinna Kalev and the Estonia women's national team.

Career
Saar has been capped for the Estonia national team, appearing for the team during the 2019 FIFA Women's World Cup qualifying cycle.

References

External links
 
 
 
 
 

1997 births
Living people
Footballers from Tallinn
Estonian women's footballers
Estonia women's international footballers
Women's association football defenders
Pärnu JK players